Nolan Catholic High School is a private, coeducational, college preparatory school, formerly in the Marianist tradition, and is located in the Roman Catholic Diocese of Fort Worth, Texas. It serves grades 9-12, has an average student population of 800, and serves the Church by educating and forming youth in the Roman Catholic faith through its mission.

School profile
Nolan Catholic High School is a private Catholic college preparatory school in Fort Worth, Tarrant County, Texas. It is one of three Catholic college preparatory schools in Tarrant County. Nolan Catholic specializes in providing a faith-filled education that prepares young adults for success in college or university and beyond. The school motto is Esto Dux, which in Latin translates to "be a leader."

Since being founded in 1961, the school has served in the ministry of the Roman Catholic Diocese of Fort Worth. Until 2014, the school was under the administration of the Society of Mary (Marianists). In 2014, the Marianists departed Nolan Catholic High School as a result of a declining population in the religious order. Since then, the school has been administered by the Catholic Diocese of Fort Worth, under the Office of the Superintendent of Schools.  Nolan Catholic is accredited by the Southern Association of Colleges and Schools and the Texas Catholic Conference Education Department (as approved by the Texas Education Agency).

Of the 97 members of faculty, two are avowed religious. Among the faculty, 50% hold advanced degrees. Past principal Anthony Pistone (1980-1987), and a priest, William Pais, CMF, were credibly accused of sexual abuse or misconduct.

The traditional college preparatory curriculum at Nolan Catholic requires 27 Carnegie units (3240 hours of instruction) for graduation. Advanced Placement and honors courses are offered in multiple disciplines.

Honors Diploma
Qualified students may earn a designated honors diploma with the appropriate notification on their transcripts.  Honors diploma requirements include a minimum cumulative numerical average of 93 by the end of the fall semester of the senior year.  The student must have taken biology, physics, chemistry, as well as three years in the same foreign language, as well as credits in other classes.

Athletics
NCHS participates in the Texas Association of Private and Parochial Schools (TAPPS) at the Class 6A level. The following sports are offered:
Baseball
Basketball
Cross country
Football
Golf
Soccer
Softball
Swimming
Tennis
Track
Volleyball

NCHS sports teams have won state championships in the following sports:
American football: 2004, 2005, 2008, 2009, 2011, 2012, 2013
Boys' cross country: 1988, 1999, 2002, 2003
Boys' pole vault: 2015, 2016
Boys' soccer: 2001, 2003, 2006, 2011, 2012, 2013
Girls' cross country: 2007
Girls' golf: 2007
Girls' tennis: 2008
Ultimate frisbee: 2012, 2013, 2014, 2015

Notable alumni

Horace Ivory, Nolan Class of 1972 member of the New England Patriots (1977-1981) and Seattle Seahawks (1981-1982)
Stephanie Klick, Republican member of the Texas House of Representatives from District 91 in Fort Worth
Ryan Peterson, Attended Nolan 1987-1990 member of the U.S. Army Task Force 121 that captured Saddam Hussein
Stephen McCarthy, Nolan Class of 2006, member of the New England Revolution
Keith Sparks, Nolan Class of 1991 member of the Oklahoma Sooners football
Carol Berg, award-winning author of science fiction and fantasy novels
Katie Meili, Nolan Class of 2009, Olympic bronze and gold medalist 2016 swimming
Nina Pham, Nolan Class of 2006 first Ebola-stricken nurse
Chelsea Surpris, Nolan Class of 2015, member of the Haitian Women’s National Team (2020-present)

Notes and references

External links
Nolan Catholic High School
NCHS Athletics

Catholic secondary schools in Texas
Educational institutions established in 1961
Private high schools in Fort Worth, Texas
High schools in Tarrant County, Texas
1961 establishments in Texas